Guy Murray Logan (February 21, 1899 – October 31, 1986) was a Canadian politician. He represented the electoral district of Halifax Centre in the Nova Scotia House of Assembly from 1933 to 1937. He was a member of the Nova Scotia Liberal Party.

Logan was born in 1899 at Elmsdale, Hants County, Nova Scotia. He was educated at Dalhousie University, and was a dental surgeon by career. He married Laurie Anderson in 1928.

Logan was elected an alderman in Halifax on May 27, 1931. He entered provincial politics in the 1933 election, winning the Halifax Centre riding by 948 votes. Logan did not reoffer in the 1937 election. After serving in World War II, Logan returned to Halifax and was named Director of Dental Services for Nova Scotia, and chief of staff, Dentistry at Camp Hill Hospital, retiring on November 21, 1964. Logan died at Halifax on October 31, 1986.

References

1899 births
1986 deaths
Dalhousie University alumni
Nova Scotia Liberal Party MLAs
People from Hants County, Nova Scotia